Shurguchi Nimgirov (died 1920) was a Buddhist priest of Kalmyk origin who was born in the Bayuda aimak (Batlaevskaia stanista) in the Salsk District of the Don Cossack Host.

Lama Nimgirov was Baksha of the khurul in the Bayuda aimak when, in 1919, he succeeded Menko Bormanzhinov as "Lama of the Don Kalmyks." One year later, Lama Nimgirov fled from the Bolsheviks to a refugee camp on Lemnos, an island in the northern part of the Aegean Sea where he later died from advanced age. He was succeeded as Lama of the Don Kalmyks by Ivan Bultinovich Kitanov, the Baksha of the khurul in the Beliavin aimak .

References
Bormanshinov, Arash. Lama Arkad Chubanov, His Predecessors and Successors, Birchbark Press, College Park, MD 1980.
Bormanshinov, Arash. THE LAMAS OF THE KALMYK PEOPLE: THE DON KALMYK LAMAS, Papers on Inner Asia, No. 18, Research Institute for Inner Asian Studies, Indiana University, Bloomington, 1991.

Tibetan Buddhist priests from Kalmykia
Year of birth missing
1920 deaths
Buddhists from the Russian Empire